Gate is a town in Beaver County, Oklahoma, United States. The population was 93 at the 2010 census.

The community was named for the fact it was the "gateway" to a ranching area.

Geography
Gate is located at  (36.851903, -100.055805).

The Hangman's Tree
The area was a part of "No Man's Land" or the Oklahoma Panhandle, where no laws from other states could reach. Outlaws could commit crimes in Kansas or Texas, ride across the border and live protected from the laws. Violence, claim jumping, and thieving forced the honest settlers to form vigilance committees. Gate and Neutral City (located approximately five miles west) had carved a niche in badman history with hot lead. Low regard for property and human life was rampant across this lawless land. Between Gate and Neutral City, (the most wicked towns in No Man's Land) three trees grew, one of which had a low hanging branch. This branch was used in rendering the "hanging" punishment. The tree measured 15 ft. in circumference, is approximately 40 ft. tall, There is no record of how many were hanged on the tree but one man said he witnessed three of them at once. The accused was in place with a rope around his neck when one of the men drew a line in the sand with the heel of his boot stating "If anyone objects let him step across the line." One man by the name of G. C. (Nease Maphet) stepped across the line.

Silica Mine 
Volcanic ash is believed by geologists to have come from a volcano in north-central New Mexico. During the volcanic age, immense quantities of materials were thrown out of these volcanoes near the opening in the earth and the ash or dust was carried by the prevailing winds and collected in depressions or drifts in the same manner that snow does. There is evidence in the deposits that settled here that the ash settled into a lake, which accounts for the uniform quality of the main deposits, which became a hill. A canyon cut through the center of the deposit and exposed the deposit as cliffs. According to a certified analysis the Gate deposit is composed of 73% Silica, 14% Alumina and smaller amounts of iron, calcium, magnesium and alkalis.

Indian Battle 
The hills on the south side are where the cavalry took their stand. Buttons from uniforms and shells they used have been found there. One man told about the battle he was a part of that drove the renegade of Indians back to the reservation they were assigned.

Old Gate 
In 1886, with the establishment of a post office, Gate City came to being. In 1894, an application was filed to move the post office for the third time. It was moved 113 rods southeast, to where several business were established and the name was changed to just Gate. Here Gate grew until the railroad came, in 1910. By this time Gate had two livery stables, a hotel, barber shop, pool hall, harness shop, grocery, real estate, hardware stores, bank, doctor's office and drug store, Masonic hall, numerous churches, furniture store, funeral home, bakery, U.S. Land office, millinery shop, lumber yard, two black smiths and a feed mill. When the railroad bypassed the town, the businessmen moved the town to the railroad, the present site of Gate.

Climate

Demographics

As of the census of 2000, there were 112 people, 47 households, and 33 families residing in the town. There were 61 housing units at an average density of 241.7 per square mile (94.2/km2). The racial makeup of the town was 98.21% White and 1.79% Native American. Hispanic or Latino of any race were 4.46% of the population.

There were 47 households, out of which 36.2% had children under the age of 18 living with them, 68.1% were married couples living together, and 27.7% were non-families. 27.7% of all households were made up of individuals, and 12.8% had someone living alone who was 65 years of age or older. The average household size was 2.38 and the average family size was 2.82.

In the town, the population was spread out, with 24.1% under the age of 18, 8.0% from 18 to 24, 24.1% from 25 to 44, 27.7% from 45 to 64, and 16.1% who were 65 years of age or older. The median age was 40 years. For every 100 females, there were 103.6 males. For every 100 females age 18 and over, there were 97.7 males.

The median income for a household in the town was $34,583, and the median income for a family was $45,000. Males had a median income of $31,563 versus $20,938 for females. The per capita income for the town was $18,891. There were 4.2% of families and 5.1% of the population living below the poverty line, including none of those under 18 or over 64.

References

External links
 - Gate

Towns in Beaver County, Oklahoma
Towns in Oklahoma
Oklahoma Panhandle